Saaremaa Municipality, also known as Saaremaa Rural Municipality, is a municipality in Saare County in western Estonia. It is the largest municipality in Estonia by land area. The administrative centre of the municipality is its only town Kuressaare.

It is one of three parishes comprising the county, along with Muhu and Ruhnu Parish. It was formed following the 2017 Estonian municipal reform on 21 October 2017 on the basis of all twelve former Saaremaa municipalities: Kuressaare town and Kihelkonna, Laimjala, Leisi, Lääne-Saare, Mustjala, Orissaare, Pihtla, Pöide, Salme, Torgu and Valjala parishes.

Gallery

Religion

References

Municipalities of Estonia